David Wilson (born September 22, 1945) is an American-born violinist and recording artist, known for his stylized arrangements of popular music, original compositions and his recordings with Henry Mancini.

Albums:
"There's a Small Hotel"
"The Romance of Paris" 
"Dreams of Hollywood Nights" 
"The Romance of Christmas" 
"Cafe Europa" 
"Easy To Love" 
"Romance After Hours" 
"Boulevard of Dreams" 
"Elegancia"
"Nobody Does It Better"
"The Crossing"

David Wilson currently resides in Los Angeles.

References

Professional  Musicians  Local 47 www.promusicians47.com

Mill City Music, Minneapolis,  Minnesota www.millcitymusic.com

ConSordino Music, Santa Monica, California www.consordinomusic.com

External links
 David Wilson  web site

Living people
American male violinists
Musicians from California
1945 births
21st-century American violinists
21st-century American male musicians